Max Hunter Harrison (December 24, 1893 – 1986) was the Principal of the United Theological College (Bangalore), the only autonomous College under the nation's first University, the Senate of Serampore College (University).

Studies
Harrison graduated from Knox College majoring in Mathematics and Greek. He then enrolled for a spiritual course at the Andover Newton Theological School, Newton where he earned a Bachelor of Sacred Theology degree. He later studied at the Harvard Graduate School of Education and the Harvard Divinity School. His dissertation was later published with the title, Hindu Monism and Pluralism as Found in the Upanishads and in the Philosophies Dependent Upon Them.

Principalship
In 1937, Harrison was appointed as the Principal of the Seminary and served until 1954 when J. R. Chandran took over.

K. M. Hiwale, a past Registrar of the College records that Harrison taught at the College during two periods, 1931-1958 and again from 1963-1965.

Writings
 1932, Hindu Monism and Pluralism as Found in the Upanishads and in the Philosophies Dependent Upon Them
 1956, The place of Old Testament studies in Indian theological education
 1957, After Ten Years.

References

Indian Christian theologians
Academic staff of the Senate of Serampore College (University)
1893 births
1986 deaths
Harvard Graduate School of Education alumni
Harvard Divinity School alumni
Knox College (Illinois) alumni